Group A was one of the two groups of the 2018 AFF Championship. It consisted of Vietnam, Malaysia, Myanmar, Cambodia and Laos. The matches were played from 8 to 24 November 2018.

Teams

Group standings 

In the semi-finals:
Vietnam advanced to play against Philippines (runners-up of Group B).
Malaysia advanced to play against Thailand (winners of Group B).

Matches

Cambodia vs Malaysia

Laos vs Vietnam

Malaysia vs Laos

Myanmar vs Cambodia

Laos vs Myanmar

Vietnam vs Malaysia

Myanmar vs Vietnam

Cambodia vs Laos

Vietnam vs Cambodia

Malaysia vs Myanmar

References

External links 
 AFF Suzuki Cup 2018 – Official website

Group stage